The Cult of the Atom: The Secret Papers of the Atomic Energy Commission is a 1982 book by Daniel Ford.  Ford is an economist and former director of the Union of Concerned Scientists, who used the Freedom of Information Act to access thousands of Atomic Energy Commission (AEC) documents.  The AEC was the predecessor of the Nuclear Regulatory Commission.

The Cult of the Atom is a piece of political literature that discusses issues brought up by the nuclear disarmament movement.

See also
List of books about nuclear issues
Three Mile Island: Thirty Minutes to Meltdown

References

1982 non-fiction books
Books about nuclear issues
Books about politics of the United States
Nuclear energy in the United States
United States Atomic Energy Commission